Jiří Rosický (born 11 November 1977) is a Czech retired footballer who played as a midfielder.

Football career
Rosický joined local Sparta Prague's youth system at the age of ten. Abroad, Rosický played for Atlético Madrid's reserve team, spending four seasons in Segunda División and being relegated in his last as the main squad had also dropped down a level in La Liga. He then spent three years in Austria playing for SC Bregenz, where he scored three times in 63 matches.

In his homeland he represented FK Baumit Jablonec in the 2003–04 Gambrinus liga. He later played for Bohemians 1905 before retiring at the age of 29, due to persistent injury problems with both knees.

Personal life
Rosický's father, also called Jiří, played football as a defender in the 1970s. His younger brother, Tomáš, a midfielder, became the third footballer of the family. Also a youth graduate at Sparta, he played several seasons with both Borussia Dortmund and Arsenal, being a longtime Czech Republic international.

References

External links
 
 
 

1977 births
Living people
Footballers from Prague
Czech footballers
Association football midfielders
Czech First League players
AC Sparta Prague players
FK Jablonec players
Segunda División players
Atlético Madrid B players
Austrian Football Bundesliga players
SW Bregenz players
Czech Republic under-21 international footballers
Czech expatriate footballers
Expatriate footballers in Spain
Expatriate footballers in Austria